The acronym HCDR may refer to:
 High-capacity data radio
 The album Hate Crew Deathroll